James Felix "Jim" Bridger (March 17, 1804 – July 17, 1881) was an American mountain man, trapper, Army scout, and wilderness guide who explored and trapped in the Western United States in the first half of the 19th century. He was known as Old Gabe in his later years. He was from the Bridger family of Virginia, English immigrants who had been in North America since the early colonial period.

Bridger was part of the second generation of American mountain men and pathfinders who followed the Lewis and Clark expedition of 1804–06, and became well-known for participating in numerous early expeditions into the western interior as well as mediating between Native American tribes and westward-migrating European-American settlers. By the end of his life, he had earned a reputation as one of the foremost frontiersmen in the American Old West. He was described as having a strong constitution that allowed him to survive the extreme conditions he encountered while exploring the Rocky Mountains from what would become southern Colorado to the Canadian border. He had conversational knowledge of French, Spanish, and several indigenous languages.

In 1830, Bridger and several associates purchased a fur company from Jedediah Smith and others, which they named the Rocky Mountain Fur Company.

Early life and career
James Felix Bridger was born on March 17, 1804, in Richmond, Virginia. His parents were James Bridger, an innkeeper in Richmond, and his wife Chloe. About 1812, the family moved near St. Louis at the eastern edge of America's vast new western frontier. At age 13, Bridger was orphaned; he had no formal education, was unable to read or write, and was apprenticed to a blacksmith. He was illiterate the whole of his life. On March 20, 1822, at age 18, he left his apprenticeship after responding to an advertisement in a St. Louis newspaper, the Missouri Republican, and joined General William Henry Ashley's fur trapping expedition to the upper Missouri River. The party included Jedediah Smith and many others who would later become famous mountain men. For the next 20 years, he repeatedly traversed the continental interior between the Canada–U.S. border and the southern boundary of present-day Colorado, and from the Missouri River westward to Idaho and Utah, either as an employee of or a partner in the fur trade.

Hugh Glass ordeal

The account of the bear attack and subsequent desertion of Hugh Glass has been repeated by many. Bridger was employed by Ashley's at the time of the attack near the forks of the Grand River in present-day Perkins County, South Dakota. John Fitzgerald and a man known as 'Bridges' stayed, waiting for him to die, as the rest of the party moved on. They began digging Glass's grave. Claiming they were interrupted by an Arikara attack, the pair grabbed Glass's rifle, knife, and other equipment and took flight. Bridges and Fitzgerald later caught up with the party and incorrectly reported to Ashley that Glass had died. It is plausible that 'Bridges' was in fact Jim Bridger.

Yellowstone and the Great Salt Lake

Bridger was among the first mountain men to explore the natural wonders of the Yellowstone region. In the fall of 1824, Bridger explored the Great Salt Lake region, reaching it by bull boat. He was one of the first European people to explore Yellowstone's springs and geysers. He also shared that the creek split in two, with one side going to the Pacific Ocean and the other side to the Atlantic Ocean. Bridger took a raft on the rapids at the Big Horn River; he was the only man known to have done this.

Guide and adviser
In 1843, Bridger and Louis Vasquez established Fort Bridger on the Blacks Fork of the Green River along the Oregon Trail.

Bridger had explored, trapped, hunted, and blazed new trails in the West since 1822 and later worked as a wilderness guide in these areas. He could reportedly assess any wagon train or group, their interests in travel, and give them expert advice on any and all aspects of heading West, over any and all trails, and to any destination the party had in mind if the leaders sought his advice. In 1846, the Donner Party came to Fort Bridger and were assured by Bridger and Vasquez that Lansford Hastings' proposed shortcut ahead was "a fine, level road, with plenty of water and grass, with the exception before stated (a forty-mile waterless stretch)." The 40-mile stretch was in fact 80 miles, and the "fine level road" was difficult enough to slow the Donner Party, who become trapped in the Sierra Nevada in the winter.

From 16 July 1857 until July 1858, Bridger was employed as a guide during the Utah War. In 1859, Bridger was paid to be the chief guide on the Yellowstone-bound Raynolds Expedition, led by Captain William F. Raynolds. Though unsuccessful in reaching Yellowstone, because of deep snow, the expedition explored Jackson Hole and Pierre's Hole.  In 1861, Bridger was a guide for Edward L. Berthoud.  From October 1863 until April 1864, Bridger was employed as a guide at Fort Laramie.

Bridger then served as a scout under Colonel Henry B. Carrington during Red Cloud's War. Bridger was stationed at Fort Phil Kearny during the Fetterman Fight, and the Wagon Box Fight.  Bridger was discharged on 21 July 1868.

Suffering from goiter and rheumatism, Bridger returned to Missouri in 1868. He was unsuccessful in collecting back rent from the government for the lease on Fort Bridger. By 1875, he was blind.

Bridger Pass and the Bridger Trail

In 1850, while guiding the Stansbury Expedition on its return from Utah, Bridger discovered what would eventually become known as Bridger Pass, an alternate overland route which bypassed South Pass and shortened the Oregon Trail by 61 miles. Bridger Pass, in what is now south-central Wyoming, would later become the chosen route across the Continental Divide, for the Overland Stage, Pony Express, the Union Pacific Railroad Overland Route, and Interstate 80.

In 1864, Bridger blazed the Bridger Trail, an alternative route from Wyoming to the gold fields of Montana that avoided the dangerous Bozeman Trail. In 1865, he served as Chief of Scouts during the Powder River Expedition.

Family and death
In 1835, Bridger married a woman from the Flathead tribe, whom he named "Emma", with whom he had three children. After she died in 1846 from fever, he married the daughter of a Shoshone chief, who died in childbirth three years later. In 1850, he married Shoshone Chief Washakie's daughter Mary Washakie Bridger and they raised two children. Some of his children were sent back east to be educated. His firstborn Mary Ann, while being tutored, was captured by a band of Cayuse during the Whitman Massacre and died soon after being released. His son Felix, who fought with the Missouri Artillery, died of sickness on Bridger's farm. His daughter Josephine, who married Jim Baker, also died, leaving his daughter Virginia as his only living child.  In 1867, while in his early sixties, his eyesight had already begun failing to the point where "he could not shoot very good."  By the early 1870s, he was living under the care of his daughter Virginia and could no longer recognize people unless they spoke.  Jim Bridger was totally blind by 1875.

Bridger died on his farm near Kansas City, Missouri, on July 17, 1881, at age 77.

Legacy

Historical reputation
Bridger is remembered as one of the most colorful and widely traveled mountain men of the era. In addition to his explorations and his service as a guide and adviser, he was known for his storytelling. His stories about the geysers at Yellowstone, for example, proved to be true. Others were grossly exaggerated or clearly intended to amuse: one of Bridger's stories involved a petrified forest in which there were "petrified birds" singing "petrified songs" (though he may have seen the petrified trees in the Tower Junction area of what is now Yellowstone National Park). Over the years, Bridger became so associated with telling tall tales that many stories invented by others were attributed to him.

Supposedly one of Bridger's favorite yarns to weave to greenhorns told of his pursuit by one hundred Cheyenne warriors. After being chased for several miles, Bridger found himself at the end of a box canyon, with the Indians bearing down on him. At this point, Bridger would go silent, prompting his listener to ask, "What happened then, Mr. Bridger?" Bridger would then reply, "They killed me."

Places and things named for Jim Bridger
 Fort Bridger
 Fort Bridger, Wyoming
 Bridger, Montana
 Bridger, South Dakota
 Bridger Bay, Utah, a bay in the Great Salt Lake at Antelope Island
 Bridger Bay Beach, Utah, a beach on Antelope Island in the Great Salt Lake
 Bridger Mountains (Wyoming)
 Bridger Mountains (Montana)
 Bridger Peak in Utah
 Bridger Pointe, a neighborhood complex in Logan, Utah
 Bridger Wilderness
 Bridger Bowl Ski Area
 Bridger Whale
 Bridger-Teton National Forest
 Bridger Pass
 Bridger Center and Bridger Gondola at Jackson Hole Mountain Resort, Teton Village, WY.
 Jim Bridger Power Station
 Bridger Lake, a lake and campground near Mountain View, Wyoming
 Bridgerland in Cache Valley in Utah and Idaho is a name that is used in many Logan, Utah-based businesses and institutions, such as Bridgerland Television and the Bridgerland Technical College.
 Bridgerland Park, a city park in Logan, Utah
 James Bridger Middle School in Independence, Missouri
 Jim Bridger Campsite in Camp Sandy Beach, Yawgoog Scout Reservation, Rockville, Rhode Island
 Jim Bridger Drive, Centerville, Utah
 Jim Bridger Drive, Eagle Mountain, Utah
 Jim Bridger Drive, Huntsville, Utah
 Jim Bridger Elementary School in Portland, Oregon
 Jim Bridger Elementary School in West Jordan, Utah
Jim Bridger Trail Run outside Bozeman, Montana
 Bridger Avenue in Las Vegas, Nevada
 Bridger Drive in Logan, Utah
 Bridger Drive in Springville, Utah
 Bridger Road in Salt Lake City, Utah
 Bridger Street in Pocatello, Idaho
 The Jim Bridger cabins, a motel in Gardiner, Montana, outside the entrance to Yellowstone National Park.
 In 2013, Bridger's Battle was announced as the new name for an old college football rivalry between Utah State and Wyoming. The winner receives a .50-caliber Rocky Mountain Hawken rifle, the "Bridger rifle", as a traveling trophy.
The Weber mandolin company of Montana had a mandolin model named the Bridger.

Media portrayals
 Raymond Hatton portrays Bridger in the 1940 film Kit Carson.
 Van Heflin plays Bridger in the 1951 film Tomahawk.
 Dennis Morgan portrays Bridger in the 1955 film The Gun That Won the West.
 Karl Swenson plays Bridger in the episode "The Jim Bridger Story" of NBC's Wagon Train, broadcast on May 10, 1961.
 James Wainwright plays Bridger in the 1976 TV movie Bridger, opposite Ben Murphy as Kit Carson.
 Gregg Palmer portrays Bridger in the 1977 episode "Kit Carson and the Mountain Man" of NBC's Walt Disney's Wonderful World of Color.
 Reb Brown portrays Bridger in the 1978 TV miniseries Centennial.
 Brad Pitt portrays Lt. Aldo Raine, "a direct-descendent of the mountain man Jim Bridger" in the 2009 film Inglourious Basterds
 Will Poulter portrays a fictionalized version of Bridger in the 2015 film The Revenant.
 Johnny Horton produced a song about Bridger, the title being his name.

References

Sources
 
Vestal, Stanley. (1970). Jim Bridger, Mountain Man. A biography. University of Nebraska Press. First Bison Book Printing.

Further reading

 
 
 
 "Affidavit discussing Jim Bridger's property and Fort Bridger"
 Jim Bridger in Idaho

1804 births
1881 deaths
19th-century American people
American explorers
Mountain men
American hunters
American fur traders
Explorers of the United States
Montana articles lacking sources
People from Franklin County, Missouri
People from Richmond, Virginia
American folklore
History of Idaho
History of Montana
History of Utah
History of Wyoming
History of the Rocky Mountains
Explorers of Montana